The 1931 German Grand Prix was a Grand Prix motor race held at the Nürburgring on 19 July 1931. There were two races held simultaneously, Class I for Grand Prix cars over 1100cc over 22 laps, and Class II for cars and cyclecars with capacity 500–1100cc over 18 laps. The race distances were chosen to make both races take approximately the same amount of time, but there were no prizes for outright positions, only for class results.

Classification

Race

Class I

Class II

References

German Grand Prix
German Grand Prix
Grand Prix